The meridian 161° west of Greenwich is a line of longitude that extends from the North Pole across the Arctic Ocean, North America, the Pacific Ocean, the Southern Ocean, and Antarctica to the South Pole.

The 161st meridian west forms a great circle with the 19th meridian east.

From Pole to Pole
Starting at the North Pole and heading south to the South Pole, the 161st meridian west passes through:

{| class="wikitable plainrowheaders"
! scope="col" width="130" | Co-ordinates
! scope="col" | Country, territory or sea
! scope="col" | Notes
|-
| style="background:#b0e0e6;" | 
! scope="row" style="background:#b0e0e6;" | Arctic Ocean
| style="background:#b0e0e6;" |
|-
| style="background:#b0e0e6;" | 
! scope="row" style="background:#b0e0e6;" | Chukchi Sea
| style="background:#b0e0e6;" |
|-
| 
! scope="row" | 
| Alaska
|-
| style="background:#b0e0e6;" | 
! scope="row" style="background:#b0e0e6;" | Bering Sea
| style="background:#b0e0e6;" | Norton Bay
|-
| 
! scope="row" | 
| Alaska
|-valign="top"
| style="background:#b0e0e6;" | 
! scope="row" style="background:#b0e0e6;" | Bering Sea
| style="background:#b0e0e6;" | Norton Sound - passing just east of Besboro Island, Alaska,  (at )
|-
| 
! scope="row" | 
| Alaska — mainland and Hagemeister Island
|-
| style="background:#b0e0e6;" | 
! scope="row" style="background:#b0e0e6;" | Bering Sea
| style="background:#b0e0e6;" | Bristol Bay
|-
| 
! scope="row" | 
| Alaska — Kudobin Islands and Alaska Peninsula
|-valign="top"
| style="background:#b0e0e6;" | 
! scope="row" style="background:#b0e0e6;" | Pacific Ocean
| style="background:#b0e0e6;" | Passing just west of Unga Island, Alaska,  (at ) Passing just east of Rakahanga atoll,  (at )
|-
| 
! scope="row" | 
| Manihiki atoll
|-
| style="background:#b0e0e6;" | 
! scope="row" style="background:#b0e0e6;" | Pacific Ocean
| style="background:#b0e0e6;" |
|-
| style="background:#b0e0e6;" | 
! scope="row" style="background:#b0e0e6;" | Southern Ocean
| style="background:#b0e0e6;" |
|-
| 
! scope="row" | Antarctica
| Ross Dependency, claimed by 
|-
|}

See also
160th meridian west
162nd meridian west

w161 meridian west